Wilmer Frederick Hosket (born December 20, 1946) is an American former professional basketball player.

A 6'8" forward/center, Hosket played basketball at Belmont High School in Dayton, Ohio, where he won an Ohio state championship in 1964. He was named Ohio Player of the Year and was also MVP of the state tournament.

He played college basketball at the Ohio State University from 1965 to 1968.  He led his Ohio State team in scoring and rebounding during each of his three varsity seasons and was named to three All Big Ten Conference Academic First Teams. In fall 1968, he competed at the Summer Olympics, winning a gold medal with the United States national basketball team.

Hosket then played four seasons (1968–1972) in the National Basketball Association as a member of the Buffalo Braves and New York Knicks. He averaged 4.0 points per game in his career and won a league championship with the Knicks in 1970.

After retiring as a player, Hosket served on three United States Olympic Basketball Committees. He also founded Buckeye Basketball Camp (not officially affiliated with Ohio State University) in his home state of Ohio.

In 1998, Hosket was named as the President of the OHSAA Foundation and served as the foundation's first executive director. He is a principal at Hosket & Ulen, an independent insurance agency. Hosket and his wife, Patty, have three grown sons (all graduates of Ohio State) and reside in Columbus.

Hosket's father, Bill Hosket, Sr., and his son, Brad Hosket, also played basketball at Ohio State.

Hosket is a member of the Ohio State Hall of Fame and was named in 1993 to the National Association of Basketball Coaches Silver Anniversary team. He was honored in 2002 by the Ohio High School Athletic Association with its highest honor – the Ethics and Integrity Award. In 2006, he was inducted into the Ohio Basketball Hall of Fame.

References

1946 births
Living people
American men's basketball players
Basketball players at the 1968 Summer Olympics
Basketball players from Dayton, Ohio
Buffalo Braves expansion draft picks
Buffalo Braves players
Centers (basketball)
Medalists at the 1968 Summer Olympics
New York Knicks draft picks
New York Knicks players
Ohio State Buckeyes men's basketball players
Olympic gold medalists for the United States in basketball
Parade High School All-Americans (boys' basketball)
Power forwards (basketball)